Wayne Shaw (born February 14, 1974) is a Canadian football player who plays safety. Currently, he is a free agent.

Early life 
Shaw played football for River East Collegiate in Winnipeg before attending North Dakota State Junior College. In 1997, he transferred to Kent State University and played two seasons for the Golden Flashes, where he made 95 total tackles (75 solo) and had three interception returns for 58 yards.

Professional career 
He was drafted 13th overall by the Toronto Argonauts in the 1999 CFL Draft. He played in all regular season games for Toronto from 1999 to 2001. He was named a CFL All-Star in 2001, when he led the league with 6 interceptions, two of which were returned for touchdowns.

In March 2002, Shaw signed with the Montreal Alouettes as a free agent. He again played in all Montreal's games including winning the 90th Grey Cup and was named an East Division All Star in 2002.

He signed as a free agent with the Hamilton Tiger-Cats in February 2003 and played until released July 11, 2007, and returned to Toronto for week 4 of the 2007 CFL season.  On July 18, 2008, Shaw was released by the Argonauts.

External links 
 Toronto Argonauts profile

1974 births
Living people
Athol Murray College of Notre Dame alumni
Black Canadian players of Canadian football
Canadian football defensive backs
Hamilton Tiger-Cats players
Kent State Golden Flashes football players
Montreal Alouettes players
Canadian football people from Winnipeg
Players of Canadian football from Manitoba
Toronto Argonauts players